The 2012 IIHF U18 World Championship was the 14th IIHF World U18 Championship and was hosted in Brno, Znojmo and Břeclav, Czech Republic. It began on 12 April 2012 with the gold medal game played on 22 April 2012.

Brno and Znojmo were originally to co-host, but a schedule change became necessary when Kometa Brno unexpectedly advanced to the Czech Extraliga finals, making their home ice unavailable to the tournament on three days.

The United States defeated Sweden 7–0 in the final to win their seventh title. Canada captured the bronze medal by beating Finland 5–4 in overtime.

Top Division 
All times are local. (Central European Summer Time – UTC+2)

Preliminary round

Group A

Group B

Relegation round

Final round

Quarterfinals

Semifinals

Fifth place game

Bronze medal game

Final

Final standings

Scoring leaders
List shows the top ten skaters sorted by points, then goals.

GP = Games played; G = Goals; A = Assists; Pts = Points; +/− = Plus/minus; PIM = Penalties In MinutesSource: IIHF.com

Leading goaltenders
Only the top five goaltenders, based on save percentage, who have played 40% of their team's minutes are included in this list.
TOI = Time on ice (minutes:seconds); SA = Shots against; GA = Goals against; GAA = Goals against average; Sv% = Save percentage; SO = ShutoutsSource: IIHF.com

Tournament Awards
Best players selected by the directorate:
Best Goalkeeper: 
Best Defenseman: 
Best Forward: 

Best players of each team
Best players of each team selected by the coaches.

Division I

Division I A
The Division I A tournament was played in Piešťany, Slovakia, from 11 to 17 April 2012.

Division I B
The Division I B tournament was played in Székesfehérvár, Hungary, from 11 to 17 April 2012.

Division II

Division II A
The Division II A tournament was played in Heerenveen, Netherlands, from 31 March to 6 April 2012.

Division II B
The Division II B tournament was played in Novi Sad, Serbia, from 20 to 26 March 2012.

Division III

The Division III tournament was played in Sofia, Bulgaria, from 12 to 18 March 2012.

References

External links
Official website

 
IIHF World U18 Championships
World
IIHF World U18 Championships
Youth ice hockey in the Czech Republic
2012
April 2012 sports events in Europe